David Ellenson is an American rabbi and academic who is known as a leader of the Reform movement in Judaism. Ellenson is currently director of the Schusterman Center for Israel Studies and visiting professor of Near Eastern and Judaic studies at Brandeis University and interim president of the Hebrew Union College-Jewish Institute of Religion (HUC-JIR). He previously served as president of HUC-JIR from 2001 to December 31, 2013, and is now chancellor emeritus of that college. Ellenson is currently serving as interim president following the death of his successor, Aaron D. Panken.

Early life and education

Ellenson was born in 1947 in Brookline, Massachusetts, and grew up in an Orthodox Jewish family in Newport News, Virginia. He was president of the student body at Newport News High School in 1964–65.

Ellenson graduated from the College of William and Mary with a B.A. in 1969.  In 1972, he earned an M.A. in religious studies from the University of Virginia.  He was then ordained at HUC-JIR in 1977 and received his Ph.D from Columbia University in 1981.

Career

Ellenson was first appointed a member of the faculty in Jewish Religious Thought at Hebrew Union College in 1979. For two decades Ellenson served as head of the Louchheim School of Judaic Studies, the undergraduate program in Jewish studies at the University of Southern California conducted under the aegis of HUC-JIR. In 1988, Ellenson was appointed the I.H. and Anna Grancell Professor of Jewish Religious Thought at HUC-JIR. He also served as a visiting professor at both UCLA and the Jewish Theological Seminary of America, and in 1997–98 he was a Lady Davis Visiting Professor of the Humanities in the Department of Jewish Thought at Hebrew University. He has been a fellow of the Shalom Hartman Institute of Jerusalem, a fellow and lecturer at the Institute of Advanced Studies at Hebrew University in Jerusalem, and a teacher at the Pardes Institute of Jewish Studies in Jerusalem. In 2015, Ellenson was appointed a distinguished visiting professor at New York University and he taught there in the Skirball Department of Judaic Studies in 2015–2016.

A scholar of modern Jewish thought and history, Ellenson is recognized for his writings and publications in these fields. He has written extensively on the origins and development of Orthodox Judaism in Germany during the nineteenth century, Orthodox legal writings on conversion in Israel, North America, and Europe during the modern era, the relationship between religion and state in Israel, the history of modern Jewish religious movements, and American Jewish life.

Ellenson has authored or edited seven books and over 300 articles and reviews in a wide variety of academic and popular journals and newspapers.

Ellenson was inaugurated as HUC's eighth president in October 2002, succeeding Rabbi Sheldon Zimmerman. Upon his retirement and assumption of the role of HUC-JIR's first chancellor, he was succeeded as president by Rabbi Aaron Panken.

David Ellenson and his daughter Ruth Andrew Ellenson, editor of The Modern Jewish Girl's Guide to Guilt, both won the National Jewish Book Award in 2006, the only father and daughter to do so in the same year since Abraham Joshua Heschel and Susannah Heschel.

President George W. Bush appointed Ellenson to serve on delegation to accompany him to Jerusalem for the celebration of the 60th anniversary of the State of Israel in May 2008.

In 2009 Newsweek named him # 5 on its list of "50 Influential Rabbis."

Books
Jewish Meaning in a World of Choice: Studies in Tradition and Modernity. The Jewish Publication Society, 2014
Pledges of Jewish Allegiance, co-authored with Daniel Gordis. Stanford University Press, 2012. Nominated for National Jewish Book Award.
After Emancipation: Jewish Religious Responses to Modernity. HUC-Press, 2004. Winner of National Jewish Book Award 2006.
Between Tradition and Culture: The Dialectics of Jewish Religion and Identity in the Modern World. Scholar's Press, 1994.
Bits of Honey: Essays for Samson H. Levey, co-edited with Stanley Chyet. Scholar's Press, 1993.
Rabbi Esriel Hildesheimer and the Creation of a Modern Jewish Orthodoxy. University of Alabama Press, 1990. Nominated for National Jewish Book Award.
Tradition in Transition: Orthodoxy. Halakhah and the Boundaries of Modern Jewish Identity. University Press of America. 1989.

References

American Jewish theologians
American Reform rabbis
Brandeis University faculty
College of William & Mary alumni
Columbia University alumni
Hebrew Union College – Jewish Institute of Religion alumni
Academic staff of the Hebrew University of Jerusalem
Living people
Presidents of Hebrew Union College – Jewish Institute of Religion
Year of birth missing (living people)
20th-century American rabbis
21st-century American rabbis